The 1951 Southern 500, the second running of the event, was a NASCAR Grand National Series  event that was held on September 3, 1951, at Darlington Raceway in Darlington, South Carolina. The winner of the race was Herb Thomas. The event had the most starters in NASCAR history with 82 cars starting the race, of which 58 cars would not finish the race and only one car (driven by Herb Thomas) finished on the lead lap.

Background
Darlington Raceway, nicknamed by many NASCAR fans and drivers as "The Lady in Black" or "The Track Too Tough to Tame" and advertised as a "NASCAR Tradition", is a race track built for NASCAR racing located near Darlington, South Carolina. It is of a unique, somewhat egg-shaped design, an oval with the ends of very different configurations, a condition which supposedly arose from the proximity of one end of the track to a minnow pond the owner refused to relocate. This situation makes it very challenging for the crews to set up their cars' handling in a way that will be effective at both ends.

The track is a four-turn  oval. The track's first two turns are banked at twenty-five degrees, while the final two turns are banked two degrees lower at twenty-three degrees. The front stretch (the location of the finish line) and the back stretch is banked at six degrees. Darlington Raceway can seat up to 60,000 people.

Darlington has something of a legendary quality among drivers and older fans; this is probably due to its long track length relative to other NASCAR speedways of its era and hence the first venue where many of them became cognizant of the truly high speeds that stock cars could achieve on a long track. The track allegedly earned the moniker The Lady in Black because the night before the race the track maintenance crew would cover the entire track with fresh asphalt sealant, in the early years of the speedway, thus making the racing surface dark black. Darlington is also known as "The Track Too Tough to Tame" because drivers can run lap after lap without a problem and then bounce off of the wall the following lap. Racers will frequently explain that they have to race the racetrack, not their competition. Drivers hitting the wall are considered to have received their "Darlington Stripe" thanks to the missing paint on the right side of the car.

Summary
He was followed by Herb Thomas, Jesse James Taylor, Fonty Flock, and Hershel McGriff. 82 cars would start the race, a NASCAR record to this day. 

The race lasted for six hours and thirty minutes. Herb Thomas led the first six laps, before Jesse James Taylor took the lead, holding it for the next 7 laps. Pole-sitter Frank Mundy dropped out with oil pressure problems 12 laps in, finishing dead last. Marshall Teague, who passed 46 cars in 13 laps, inherited the lead on lap 13. After Curtis Turner took the lead on lap 52, Herb Thomas would grab the lead back from Turner on lap 95,  leading the rest of the race to defeat Jesse James Taylor by more than one lap, in front of forty thousand people. Buddy Shuman would finish third, eight laps down, while Hershel McGriff and Fireball Roberts made up the top five. Turner would drop out of the race with a blown engine 272 laps in.

This race demonstrates how the NASCAR Cup Series has changed over the years. If a driver started in 36th place during the early-1950s, they were 46 spots ahead of last place. If a driver started in 36th place in a 21st century NASCAR race, they become probably a backmarker and are profoundly unlikely to win the race or even finish in a respectable top-ten finish. 

Oliver Dial, Frank Gise, Rudy Hires, Sandy Lynch, Fred Moore, Bob Pronger, Gwyn Staley, Billy Tibbett, and Herb Trimble would make their respective professional stock car racing starts in this event. Notable crew chiefs for this race were Smokey Yunick, Buckshot Morris, and Doug Meeks.

This race would be Red Byron's final race in NASCAR. Total winnings for this race were $23,740 ($ when adjusted for inflation). As it was with all races during this era, there was no televised coverage of this racing event.

Qualifying
Note: Qualifying was an eight-lap run; the fastest lap time was actually 53.4 seconds while the slowest lap time was 54.6 seconds.

Results

 Herb Thomas
 Jesse James Taylor
 Buddy Shuman
 Hershel McGriff
 Fireball Roberts
 Harold Kite
 Leon Sales
 Fonty Flock
 Bill Snowden
 Pap White
 Tim Flock
 Slick Smith
 Jack Goodwin
 Billy Carden
 Lee Petty
 Gober Sosebee
 Bud Farrell
 Billy Myers
 Bill Widenhouse
 George Seeger
 Gayle Warren
 Freddie Farmer
 Cotton Owens
 Ed Benedict
 Red Byron
 Bud Riley
 Bob Flock
 Jimmie Lewallen
 Tommy Melvin
 Earl Moss
 Ewell Weddle
 Shorty York
 Marshall Teague
 Johnny Yontz
 Ted Swaim
 Jim Fiebelkorn
 Gene Comstock
 Oliver Dial
 Jim Paschal
 Reino Tulonen
 Ted Chamberlain
 J.E. Hardie
 Donald Thomas
 Iggy Katona
 Joe Merola
 Dave Anderson
 Bob Pronger
 Jack Smith
 Billy Tibbert
 Jimmy Warden
 Gene Darragh
 Gwyn Staley
 Jim Delaney
 Erick Erickson
 Bill Blair
 Buck Baker
 Curtis Turner
 Wade Fields
 Lloyd Dane
 John Barker
 Buck Baity
 Ray Chase
 Jimmy Thompson
 Jimmy Ayers
 Frank Giese
 Sandy Lynch
 Bob Johnson
 Herb Trimble
 Bob KIng
 Tommy Thompson
 Bill Rexford
 Fred Moore
 Weldon Adams
 Murrace Walker
 Joe Eubanks
 Johnny Mantz
 Rudy Hires
 Sonny Black
 Lloyd Moore
 Lee Connell
 Bobby Booth
 Frank Mundy

Joe Weatherly withdrew before the race.

Timeline
Section reference: 
 Start of race: Herb Thomas officially had the pole position to begin the event.
 Lap 6: Jesse James Taylor took over the lead from Herb Thomas.
 Lap 12: Hershel McGriff took over the lead from Jesse James Taylor.
 Lap 13: Marshall Teague took over the lead from Hershel McGriff.
 Lap 52: Curtis Turner took over the lead from Marshall Teague.
 Lap 58: Lee Connell had a terminal crash, forcing him out of the race.
 Lap 95: Herb Thomas took over the lead from Curtis Turner.
 Lap 215: The wheels on Frank Gise's vehicle stopped working properly, causing him to leave the event early.
 Lap 272: Curtis Turner managed to blow his engine; forcing him out of the race.
 Lap 361: Marshall Teague and Johnny Yountz had terminal crashes at roughly the same time, forcing them out of the race.
 Lap 368: Red Byron had a terminal crash, forcing him out of the race.
 Lap 370: Gayle Warren had a terminal crash, forcing him out of the race.
 Finish: Herb Thomas was officially declared the winner of the event.

References

Southern 500
Southern 500
NASCAR races at Darlington Raceway